is the first visual novel developed by Navel's sister brand Lime.

The story concerns a girl who suddenly appears in front of Nagi Tsukuba, the protagonist, claiming to be the incarnation of Nostradamus' The Prophecies.  She claims that it is somehow his fault that the world did not end in July 1999 (as supposedly predicted in century 10, quatrain 72), and that Nostradamus, being extremely bothered by this, has sent her to prove to Nagi that the prophecies are to be respected.

Characters

Main characters

Nagi is the main hero in Nostradamus ni Kiite Miro♪ and the role the player assumes.

Stra is the proclaimed Nostradamus Prophecy. She's brave and positive.

Thiya is the encarnation of Agastya.

Kukuri is Thiya's owner. Claims that she will be Nagi's wife in the future.

Chikuya is the most popular girl at school.

 Honoka is Nagi's sister-in-law.

Sub characters

Other

Masato is a boy who always appears in Navel and Lime games peeking at the girls' underwear.

External links
Official website 

2008 video games
Bishōjo games
Eroge
Japan-exclusive video games
Video games developed in Japan
Visual novels
Windows games
Windows-only games
Cultural depictions of Nostradamus